Valu Kola (also Romanized as Valū Kolā and Valū Kalā) is a village in Gatab-e Jonubi Rural District, Gatab District, Babol County, Mazandaran Province, Iran. At the 2006 census, its population was 1,586, in 410 families.

References 

Populated places in Babol County